The New Atlantic Charter is an agreement that was signed by the Prime Minister of the United Kingdom Boris Johnson and the President of the United States Joe Biden on 10 June 2021. The agreement was signed at the first face-to-face meeting between Johnson and Biden at the 2021 G7 Summit in Cornwall, England.

The agreement is a new version of the Atlantic Charter, declared by British Prime Minister Winston Churchill and American President Franklin D. Roosevelt in 1941. The meeting at which the agreement was declared was used to redefine the Western alliance.

Background
The original Atlantic Charter is an agreement that was issued by Winston Churchill and Franklin D. Roosevelt in 1941. It was a declaration of a Western commitment to democracy and territorial integrity, months before the US entered World War II. The original charter affirmed that the US and UK sought no territorial gains, that all people had a right to self-determination, territorial adjustments must be in accord with the peoples concerned, trade barriers should be lowered, and there should be a disarmament after the war.

The new agreement was signed at the 2021 G7 summit in Cornwall at the first face-to-face meeting between Joe Biden and Boris Johnson since Joe Biden took office. Joe Biden "affirmed the Special Relationship between our people and renewed our commitment to defending the enduring democratic values that both our nations share". The New Atlantic Charter also reaffirmed "the commitments and aspirations set out eighty years ago," while also addressing the "new challenges" of the 21st century.

Objectives
The article issues eight aims:

 To defend the principles and institutions of democracy and open societies
 To strengthen and adapt the institutions, laws and norms that sustain international co-operation
 To remain united behind principles of sovereignty, territorial integrity and peaceful resolution of disputes
 To harness and protect the countries' innovative edge in science and technology
 To affirm the shared responsibility to maintain collective security and international stability, including against cyber threats; and to declare the countries' nuclear deterrents to the defence of NATO
 To continue building an inclusive, fair, climate-friendly, sustainable, rules-based economy
 To prioritise climate change in all international action
 To commit to continuing to collaborate to strengthen health systems and advance health protections

See also
 AUKUS

References

External links
 New Atlantic Charter and Joint Statement agreed by the PM and President Biden on gov.uk.
 The New Atlantic Charter on the White House website

2021 conferences
2021 documents
2021 in international relations
2021 in law
2020s in Cornwall
June 2021 events in the United Kingdom
June 2021 events in the United States
Political charters
United Kingdom–United States relations
Presidency of Joe Biden
Boris Johnson